Jeff Hoover (born January 18, 1960) is an American politician in the Republican Party of Kentucky.

Early life and career

Hoover is a 1982 graduate of Centre College and a 1987 graduate of Cumberland School of Law. Hoover has been a member of the Kentucky House of Representatives representing the 83rd district since 1996. He was selected to serve as House Minority Caucus Chair in 1999, and served as House Minority Leader, a position he held 2001 to 2017. Hoover unsuccessfully ran for Lieutenant Governor of the State of Kentucky in 2007 as the running mate of former U.S. Rep. Anne Northup; their slate received 36.5% of the vote in the primary against Gov. Ernie Fletcher.

In 2015, Hoover became the longest serving Republican Leader in the history of the Kentucky House of Representatives. After the 2016 elections when Republicans gained a supermajority in the State House, Hoover was selected as House Speaker replacing Democrat Greg Stumbo, becoming the first Republican speaker in 95 years.

Resignation
On November 4, 2017, Kentucky Governor Matt Bevin and eight House Republicans called on Hoover to resign after it was revealed that Hoover had settled a case involving alleged sexual harassment. The next day, Hoover announced his intent to resign as House Speaker. He was succeeded by Speaker Pro Tem David Osborne.  Bevin said he was not satisfied with Hoover merely stepping down from his leadership position; he called on Hoover and others to resign their seats. On January 8, 2018, Hoover resigned from his position as Speaker of the House but remained a House Representative for the 83rd District.

Personal life
Hoover lives in Jamestown, Kentucky.

References

External links
Jeff Hoover at Ballotpedia
Our Campaigns – Representative Jeff Hoover (KY) profile
Project Vote Smart – Representative Jeff Hoover (KY) profile
Profile at Hoover and Hurt
Issues Confronting the 2009 Kentucky General Assembly

1960 births
Living people
Republican Party members of the Kentucky House of Representatives
Centre College alumni
People from Albany, Kentucky
People from Jamestown, Kentucky
21st-century American politicians
Speakers of the Kentucky House of Representatives